Abutilon × milleri, also known as Miller abutilon, is a hybrid species, the result of cross of A. megapotamicum and possibly A. pictum, in the family Malvaceae. It is an evergreen species of flowering plant. It has gained the Royal Horticultural Society's Award of Garden Merit as an ornamental.

Description 
Abutilon × milleri is a highly branched shrub that can grow up to 2m tall. They have 3-lobed leaves and bell-shaped flowers that are around 4cm long with yellow-orange petals.

Cultivation 
They prefer to grow in weakly acidic to neutral, well-drained, loam soil under full sun. They can also be propagated with cuttings, although hardwood cuttings can only be propagated in autumn. They can tolerate temperatures as low as -10 °C. In addition, they have resistance to honey fungus.

Uses

Ornamental 
Miller abutilon plants are popular garden plants, due to their floral display.

As food 
This plant is edible. It may be eaten cooked or raw and is said to have a sweet taste.

References 

milleri
Hybrid plants